Sister Joyce Mansfield Woollard (1923–1997) was a missionary who served with the London Missionary Society / C.W.M. in Coimbatore Diocese of the Church of South India from 1948 and at Vishranthi Nilayam, Bangalore from 1988

Sister Woollard came to India on November 12, 1948. She was in the language school in 1949. She joined the order of sisters when it was started in 1952 as a Probationer, in St. Mark's Cathedral, Bangalore.
	
She worked in the villages around Kodumudi and Erode going on a bicycle. She maintained the contacts made during the evangelistic work in the villages, later when she worked in various capacities in Erode and Salem.

She was the convener of Women’s Work Committee, Hostel and Boarding Homes Committee and Creche Committee. She was the correspondent of Elementary Schools in Erode, Hobart School in Salem and Senior Citizen's Homes in Athur. She was a member of the Diocesan Executive Committee, Secretary and Treasurer of the Women's Fellowship of Coimbatore Diocese and of the order for women.

After retirement she came to Vishranthi Nilayam as the warden bringing her rich experience in the service of the order and the Mother House of the order for women. She was a great administrator, generous giver, loyal friend and above all an active member of the church. She lived an abundant life with a kind of passionate intensity.

References 

 Vishranthi Nilayam, Bangalore
 Thiru P. S. Thangadurai, M.A.,M.Ed., Headmaster (Rtd), Erode
 Mrs. Shanthi Thangaraj Headmistress M.A.,B.Ed.,(Rtd), Erode
 Mr. S.Moses Jeba Seelan M.B.A, Erode

British Protestant missionaries
Protestant missionaries in India
1923 births
1997 deaths
Female Christian missionaries
Missionary educators
British expatriates in India